Sympistis cocytus is a moth of the family Noctuidae first described by James T. Troubridge in 2008.

Adults are on wing from mid-August to late September.

References

cocytus
Moths described in 2008